Charles H. Israels (born August 10, 1936) is an American jazz composer, arranger, and bassist who is best known for his work with the Bill Evans Trio. He has also worked with Billie Holiday, Benny Goodman, Coleman Hawkins, Stan Getz, Herbie Hancock, J. J. Johnson, John Coltrane, and Judy Collins.

Biography
Born in New York City, Chuck Israels was raised in a musical family which moved to Cleveland, Ohio, when he was 10. His stepfather Mordecai Bauman was a singer who performed extensively with composer Hanns Eisler. He, along with Israels' mother, Irma Commanday, created a home environment in which music was a part of normal daily activity. Paul Robeson, Pete Seeger, and The Weavers were visitors to the Bauman home. In 1948, the appearance of Louis Armstrong's All Stars in a concert series produced by his parents gave him his first opportunity to meet and hear jazz musicians.

In college, Israels had the opportunity to perform with Billie Holiday. His first professional job after college was working with pianist Bud Powell in Paris. His first professional recording was Stereo Drive (aka Coltrane Time) with John Coltrane, Cecil Taylor, Kenny Dorham, and Louis Hayes. The recording showcased Israels as a composer with his composition "Double Clutching". Israels is best known for his work with the Bill Evans Trio from 1961 through 1966, having replaced the deceased Scott LaFaro,  and for the Jazz Repertory as Director of the National Jazz Ensemble from 1973 to 1981. He made recordings with Kronos Quartet and Rosemary Clooney in 1985. He was the Director of Jazz Studies at Western Washington University in Bellingham, Washington until 2010. In 2011, he created the Chuck Israels Jazz Orchestra and recorded Second Wind: A Tribute to the Music of Bill Evans in 2013.

Humphrey Lyttelton, presenting Jazz 625 in 1965, said that Israels was "a superb technician who handles the double bass as easily as if it were a guitar... Chuck Israels is one of the reasons why musicians have come reeling away from performances by the Bill Evans Trio in a mood poised between elation and utter despair."

Discography

As leader

As sideman

References

External links
 Biography and management

1936 births
Living people
Jewish American jazz composers
American jazz double-bassists
Male double-bassists
American music arrangers
Fiorello H. LaGuardia High School alumni
Western Washington University faculty
Jewish jazz musicians
Musicians from Cleveland
Jazz musicians from New York (state)
Jazz musicians from Ohio
21st-century double-bassists
21st-century American male musicians
21st-century American Jews